Frederick Sheffield (February 26, 1902 – May 8, 1971) was an American rower, born in New York City, who competed in the 1924 Summer Olympics. In 1924, he was part of the American boat, which won the gold medal in the eights.

References

External links
 
 
 

1902 births
1971 deaths
Sportspeople from New York City
American male rowers
Olympic gold medalists for the United States in rowing
Rowers at the 1924 Summer Olympics
Medalists at the 1924 Summer Olympics
Yale Law School alumni